Rhopalocarpus is a genus of plants in the family Sphaerosepalaceae. Most species are trees and all are endemic to Madagascar. The generic name is from the Greek meaning "club fruit", referring to the fruit shape.

Species
The Plant List and Tropicos recognise 17 accepted species:
 Rhopalocarpus alternifolius  
 Rhopalocarpus binervius  
 Rhopalocarpus coriaceus  
 Rhopalocarpus crassinervius  
 Rhopalocarpus excelsus  
 Rhopalocarpus longipetiolatus  
 Rhopalocarpus louvelii  
 Rhopalocarpus lucidus  
 Rhopalocarpus macrorhamnifolius  
 Rhopalocarpus mollis  
 Rhopalocarpus parvifolius  
 Rhopalocarpus randrianaivoi  
 Rhopalocarpus similis  
 Rhopalocarpus suarezensis  
 Rhopalocarpus thouarsianus  
 Rhopalocarpus triplinervius  
 Rhopalocarpus undulatus

References

 
Malvales genera
Taxa named by Wenceslas Bojer